The Caleb Wiley House is a historic house at 125 North Street in Stoneham, Massachusetts.  Built c. 1826, this -story wood-frame house is one of Stonham's best-preserved late Federal period houses.  The house was listed on the National Register of Historic Places in 1984.

Description and history
The Caleb Wiley House is set on the north side of North Street, a major east–west route through residential areas of northwestern Stoneham, amid 20th-century residential houses that are mostly on smaller lots.  It is a -story wood-frame house, five bays wide, with a side-gable roof, twin rear-wall chimneys, clapboard siding, and a granite foundation.  Window and door surrounds are simple, with the second-floor windows butting against the cornice, a typical Federal period feature.  Its front door is sheltered by a portico that is early 20th century in appearance, and has flanking sidelight windows.  A screen porch is attached to the left side, and a modern addition is attached to the rear.

The house was built about 1826 by Caleb Wiley, at a time when North Street was lined with larger properties mainly in agricultural use.  The original  lot of this house has long since been subdivided into residences, but this property retains mature plantings, and the main house is relatively little-altered since its construction.

See also
National Register of Historic Places listings in Stoneham, Massachusetts
National Register of Historic Places listings in Middlesex County, Massachusetts

References

Houses on the National Register of Historic Places in Stoneham, Massachusetts
Federal architecture in Massachusetts
Houses completed in 1826
Houses in Stoneham, Massachusetts
1826 establishments in Massachusetts